Photomutagenicity is the property of being photomutagenic, in that when irradiated by visible or UV light, a photomutagenic chemical substance (e.g., umbelliferone) - found in or on an organism - can cause mutation(s) of that particular organism. Other photomutagenic substances include furocoumarins and limettin.

References

Mutagens
Photochemistry